Bandar-e Mollu (also Romanized as Bandar-e Mollū; also known as Melū, Milu, Mollav, Molū, and Mūllū) is a village in Moghuyeh Rural District, in the Central District of Bandar Lengeh County, Hormozgan Province, Iran. At the 2006 census, its population was 513, in 75 families.

References 

Populated places in Bandar Lengeh County